The Association of Free Lutheran Congregations (AFLC) is the sixth largest Lutheran church body in the United States. The AFLC includes congregations from the former Lutheran Free Church in 27 different U.S. states and four Canadian provinces. The AFLC is not an incorporated synod, but a free association. Each local congregation is a separate corporation. Minnesota is the geographic center of the organization, with over 80 congregations and over 12,000 members. There are also numerous congregations in the neighboring states of North Dakota, South Dakota, and Wisconsin. The AFLC headquarters are in Plymouth, Minnesota, where the Association Free Lutheran Bible School and Seminary are also located.

The beliefs of the AFLC are grounded in Pietist Lutheran tradition. The AFLC logo consists of an open Bible, ascending dove, and green vine. The open Bible is symbolic of God's word as the foundation of faith and life; the ascending dove is symbolic of the freedom of congregation and the power and guidance of the Holy Spirit; and the green vine is symbolic of the living congregation bearing fruit for God.

History
The AFLC was formed in 1962 by 40 churches that were members of the former Lutheran Free Church who did not want to join the 1963 merger into The American Lutheran Church (ALC). The ALC had been formed in 1960 by the merger of several ethnic Lutheran denominations. The AFLC was originally called the Lutheran Free Church-not merged, but the ALC filed suit against the group for using the name Lutheran Free Church. The name Association of Free Lutheran Congregations was chosen by 1964. In 2006, the AFLC had 43,360 baptized members in 267 churches and in 2009, the AFLC had 277 pastors, 280 congregations, and 44,473 members.

Doctrine
The AFLC accept and believe in the Holy Bible as the complete written Word of God, preserved by the Holy Spirit for salvation and instruction. The AFLC accepts the ancient ecumenical symbols, namely, the Apostles, the Nicene, and the Athanasian Creeds; Luther's Small Catechism, and the unaltered Augsburg Confession, as the true expression of the Christian faith and life.

There were five principal reasons for the formation of the AFLC:

Recognition of the Bible as the inspired and inerrant authority in all matters of faith and life. 
Recognition that the teaching and preaching of God's Word is the main task of the Church, to be conducted in such a way that the saints are built up and unbelievers see their need for salvation.
Belief that the congregation is the right form of the Kingdom of God on earth, with no authority above it but the Word and the Spirit of God;
Belief that Christian unity is a spiritual concept, not a man-made organization such as the World Council of Churches or the National Council of Churches. 
Belief that Christians are called to be a salt and light, separated from the ways of the world, and that this difference is to be reflected in the life of the congregation as well as in the institutions of the church body.

Unlike most other conservative Lutheran bodies in the United States, the AFLC allows open communion and women's suffrage in congregational voting.

Committees and corporations
The AFLC has five corporations that are sponsored by the AFLC to direct their common endeavors: the Coordinating Committee, the Schools Corporation, the Missions Corporation, the AFLC Foundation, and the Association Retreat Center (ARC. There are two auxiliary corporations in the AFLC: the Women's Missionary Federation (WMF) and Free Lutheran Youth (FLY).

Coordinating Committee

The coordinating committee consists of seven members from the congregations currently part of the AFLC. The main duties of the coordinating committee includes monitoring the pastoral roster, monitoring the congregational roster, and providing guidance for the other ministries of the AFLC, including youth, evangelism, parish education, etc.

Schools Corporation

The schools corporation's main delegation is the election of the board of trustees, that governs the Free Lutheran Bible College and Seminary (FLBCS). This corporation consists of fifty members from the congregations of the AFLC. The AFLC leaders decided to create a Lutheran Bible School patterned after the fundamental teachings of the Lutheran Bible Institute founded in 1919. The school was opened in 1966 with 13 students but grew to 35 the next year. By the 1990s, the school, renamed to Association Free Lutheran Bible Seminary, was averaging 105 students. Today there are approximately 100 students attending the school.

Missions Corporation

The missions corporation consists of one hundred members of the congregations of the AFLC and elects from itself a Home Missions Committee and a World Missions Committee which are involved in the outreach of the AFLC into the United States and several other countries.

AFLC Foundation

Association Retreat Center
The Association Retreat Center (ARC) is a separate organization of the AFLC located near Osceola, Wisconsin, that serves as a retreat center for various activities within the AFLC.

Other committees and corporations
The Women's Missionary Federation (WMF) serves the women of the churches with Bible studies, fellowship, and has an emphasis on missionary services.

The Free Lutheran Youth (FLY) is a youth organization dealing with youth ministry.

Publications
The official publication of the AFLC is The Lutheran Ambassador, with twelve issues per year devoted to Bible-centered articles and news of the churches. Ambassador Publications is the parish education department of the AFLC.

The Ambassador Hymnal is the hymnal published by the AFLC. It contains over 600 hymns as well as a selected order of church services and responsive Bible readings.

Presidents

 John P. Strand (1962–1978)
 Richard Snipstead (1978–1992)
 Robert L. Lee (1992–2007)
 Elden K. Nelson (2007–2013)
 Lyndon Korhonen (2013–2022)
 Micah Hjermstad (2022-Present)

Annual conferences
The AFLC schedules an annual conference to share reports of congregations and other various ministries. The main reason for these conferences is spiritual edification, as the schedules include prayer times, worship hours, and business meetings together. At the conference, suggestions for changes are presented and discussed and the elections for positions in committees/corporations are conducted.

1963 Fargo, North Dakota
1964 Valley City, North Dakota
1965 Minneapolis, Minnesota
1966 Thief River Falls, Minnesota
1967 Fargo, North Dakota
1968 Cloquet, Minnesota
1969 Minneapolis, Minnesota
1970 Valley City, North Dakota
1971 Cloquet, Minnesota
1972 Minneapolis, Minnesota
1973 Ferndale, Washington
1974 Thief River Falls, Minnesota
1975 Minneapolis, Minnesota
1976 Hancock, Minnesota
1977 Fargo, North Dakota
1978 Minneapolis, Minnesota
1979 Whitefish, Montana
1980 Valley City, North Dakota
1981 Minneapolis, Minnesota
1982 Dickinson, North Dakota
1983 Osceola, Wisconsin
1984 Minneapolis, Minnesota
1985 Osceola, Wisconsin
1986 Warm Beach, Washington
1987 Thief River Falls, Minnesota
1988 DeKalb, Illinois
1989 Minot, North Dakota
1990 Bloomington, Minnesota
1991 Osceola, Wisconsin
1992 Osceola, Wisconsin
1993 DeKalb, Illinois
1994 Valley City, North Dakota
1995 Osceola, Wisconsin
1996 Stanwood, Washington
1997 Thief River Falls, Minnesota
1998 Red Wing, Minnesota
1999 Fergus Falls, Minnesota
2000 Osceola, Wisconsin
2001 Williston, North Dakota
2002 El Campo, Texas
2003 Brookings, South Dakota
2004 Osceola, Wisconsin
2005 Valley City, North Dakota
2006 Stanwood, Washington
2007 Sioux Falls, South Dakota
2008 Oklahoma City, Oklahoma 
2009 Fergus Falls, Minnesota 
2010 Plymouth, Minnesota 
2011 Sioux Falls, South Dakota
2012 Thief River Falls, Minnesota
2013 Osceola, Wisconsin
2014 Valley City, North Dakota
2015 Stanwood, Washington
2016 Osceola, Wisconsin
2017 Plymouth, Minnesota 
2018 Dickinson, North Dakota
2019 Canadensis, Pennsylvania
2020 Osceola, Wisconsin
2021 Plymouth, Minnesota
2022 Osceola, Wisconsin

See also

List of Lutheran denominations

References

Lutheran denominations in North America
Christian organizations established in 1962
1962 establishments in the United States